Qapqal Xibe Autonomous County (Xibe: , Cabcal Sibe beye dasangga siyan, also transliterated as Chapchal,) in Ili Kazakh Autonomous Prefecture in Northern Xinjiang, is the only Xibe autonomous county of the People's Republic of China, bordering Kazakhstan's Almaty Region to the west. It has an area of 4,430 square kilometers and a population 160,000 (2000). Qapqal means "the granary" in the Xibe language.

Subdivisions
The Xibe, sent to garrison the area by the Qing dynasty, were divided into eight niru (companies); each niru established a settlement. The settlements are thus simply referred to as "First Niru" through "Eighth Niru", with the exception of the settlement established by the Sixth, which came to be known as Qapqal, thus giving the county its name.

Climate

Media

The county has one Xibe language newspaper, the Qapqal News. A television station broadcasts a few programmes in Xibe as well each month, with Mandarin, Uyghur and Kazakh language content for the rest of the time.

References

External links 
 County info page, at an  Ili Kazak Autonomous Prefecture info site

Autonomous counties of the People's Republic of China
Ili Kazakh Autonomous Prefecture
Sibe people